Bontoc, officially the Municipality of Bontoc, is a 2nd class municipality and capital of the province of Mountain Province, Philippines. According to the 2020 census, it has a population of 24,104 people.

Bontoc is the historical capital of the entire Cordillera region since the inception of governance in the Cordillera. The municipality celebrates the annual Lang-ay Festival.

Bontoc is home to the Bontoc tribe, a feared war-like group of indigenous people who actively indulged in tribal wars with its neighbors until the 1930s. Every Bontoc male had to undergo a rite of passage into manhood, which may include headhunting, where the male has to journey (sometimes with companions) and hunt for a human head. The Bontoc also used the jaw of the hunted head as a handle for gongs, and as late as the early 1990s, evidence of this practice can be seen from one of the gongs in Pukisan, Bontoc. The town also hosts the UNESCO tentatively-listed Alab petroglyphs.

History

Samuel E. Kane, the American supervisor and then Governor, established the capital here after the Philippine Commission passed the Mountain Province Act in 1908, building a provincial building, hospital, doctor's office, nurse's home, a school, and provincial prison.  He also built the Tagudin-Bontoc trail, which by 1926, could accommodate a small car.

Bontoc was one of several municipalities in Mountain Province which would have been flooded by the Chico River Dam Project during the Marcos dictatorship, alongside Bauko, Sabangan, Sagada, Sadanga, and parts of Barlig.  However, the indigenous peoples of Kalinga Province and Mountain Province resisted the project and when hostilities resulted in the murder of Macli-ing Dulag, the project became unpopular and was abandoned before Marcos was ousted by the 1986 People Power Revolution.

Geography

Barangays
Bontoc is politically subdivided into 16 barangays. These barangays are headed by elected officials: Barangay Captain, Barangay Council, whose members are called Barangay Councilors. All are elected every three years.

Climate

Demographics

Most inhabitants speak the Bontoc language, with other major languages being Kankana-ey and Ilocano. Minor languages spoken include Tagalog, Pangasinan, Cuyonon and Butuanon.

Economy 

The local economy depends largely on small trades and agriculture. This capital town's biggest economic potential is tourism with its smaller rice terraces in Barangay Bay-yo, Maligcong and other areas.

Government
Bontoc, belonging to the lone congressional district of the province of Mountain Province, is governed by a mayor designated as its local chief executive and by a municipal council as its legislative body in accordance with the Local Government Code. The mayor, vice mayor, and the councilors are elected directly by the people through an election which is being held every three years.

Elected officials

Members of the Municipal Council (2019–2022):
 Congressman: Maximo Y. Dalog Jr.
 Mayor: Jerome “Chagsen” Tudlong, Jr. 
 Vice-Mayor: Eusebio S. Kabluyen
 Councilors:
 Jupiter Kalangeg
 Dan Evert Sokoken
 Timothy Pongad
 Glenn Bacala
 Peter C. Kedawen
 Julian Chumacog
 Benedict Odsey II
 Viola Okko

Culture

The highland town of Bontoc is home to two National Cultural Treasures of the Philippines. These are the Stone Agricultural Calendar of Bontoc and Petroglyphs of Alab.

The Alab petroglyphs are ancient figures carved on mountain walls by the prehistoric people of Bontoc. The petroglyphs are the most important ancient rock art carvings in the Cordilleras and the second oldest in the entire country, second only to the Angono petroglyphs of Rizal. Due to its high significance, it was submitted by the National Commission for Culture and the Arts of the Philippines to the UNESCO Tentative List of Heritage Sites in 2006, pending its inclusion in the World Heritage List along with the Singanapan charcoal-drawn petrographs of southern Palawan, Angono petroglyphs of Rizal province, charcoal-drawn Peñablanca petrographs of Cagayan, and the Anda red hermatite print petrographs of Bohol.

Education

Secondary education

 ALBAGO National High School, Balili
 Dalican National High School, Dalican
 Guina-ang National High School, Guina-ang
 Mountain Province General Comprehensive High School, Poblacion
 Saint Vincent School, Poblacion
 Talubin National High School, Talubin
 Tocucan National High School, Tocucan

Tertiary education
Mountain Province State Polytechnic College is the first tertiary institution in the municipality that offers various undergraduate and graduate courses.

XiJen College of Mountain Province is the only private tertiary institution that also offers technical-vocational courses.

References

External links

Bontoc local government website
 [ Philippine Standard Geographic Code]
Philippine census information

Municipalities of Mountain Province
Provincial capitals of the Philippines
Populated places on the Rio Chico de Cagayan